David Cort (1904–1983) was a 20th-century American writer (journalist, columnist, editor, and prose writer), best known as foreign news editor at Life magazine.

Background

In 1924, Cort graduated from Columbia University, where  he had been editor of The Jester.

Career

By the late 1920s, Cort had become a contributor to Vanity Fair magazine.

In 1932, he joined Time magazine as assistant foreign news editor.

In 1936, he moved to Life as foreign news editor.  He is best known for his work there in selecting and captioning photographs shot during World War II.

He also contributed to The Nation magazine and The New York Times Book Review.

Personal and death

Cort had one son.

He died age 79 on October 11, 1983, in New York City.

Awards

 1971: Guggenheim Fellow (General Nonfiction)

Works

Books:
 The Big Picture 
 Social Astonishments 
 The Glossy Rats 
 Revolution by Cliche 
 The Sin of Henry R. Luce (New York: L. Stuart, 1974)

Articles:
 "Of Guilt and Resurrection," The Nation (March 20, 1967) on the Hiss-Chambers case

References

External sources

 Harper's: David Cort
 The Nation: David Cort

1904 births
1983 deaths
20th-century American journalists
American male journalists
Columbia College (New York) alumni
Life (magazine) people
Time (magazine) people